Schanz Glacier is a glacier  long in the Heritage Range, draining south between Soholt Peaks and Collier Hills to enter Union Glacier. It was mapped by United States Geological Survey (USGS) from surveys and U.S. Navy air photos in 1961 to 1966. It was named by Advisory Committee on Antarctic Names (US-ACAN) for Lieutenant Commander Thomas L. Schanz, supply officer with U.S. Navy Squadron VX-6 during Deep Freeze in 1965.

See also
 Glaciology
 List of glaciers in the Antarctic

References

 

Glaciers of Ellsworth Land